Sarzbüttel is a municipality in the district of Dithmarschen, Schleswig-Holstein, Germany. It is known globally for its cheese. Cheesemaker Meiereigenossenschaft Sarzbüttel was founded in 1888.

Daniel Popp, a German comedian, was raised in Sarzbüttel.

References

External links
 Meiereigenossenschaft Sarzbüttel eG cheese dairy

Dithmarschen